The Apostolic Nunciature to Yugoslavia was an ecclesiastical office of the Catholic Church in Yugoslavia. It was a diplomatic post of the Holy See, whose representative is called the Apostolic Nuncio with the rank of an ambassador.

The Kingdom of Serbs, Croats and Slovenes was created in the aftermath of the First World War; its name was changed to Yugoslavia in 1929. The Nunciature to Yugoslavia was created in 1921 and ended with the overthrow of the Yugoslav monarchy and the creation of a Communist government at the end of World War II. Following the dissolution of the Soviet Union and the Warsaw Pact, Yugoslavia and the Holy See reestablished relations in 1976. As Yugoslavia subdivided into a group of successor states, each with its own diplomatic relations with the Holy See, the responsibilities of the Nunciature to Yugoslavia shrank until the last Apostolic Nuncio to Yugoslavia was appointed in 2000 when the nunciature in Belgrade was located in the Federation of Montenegro and Serbia, which then dissolved in 2006, transforming the nunciature in Belgrade into the Apostolic Nunciature to Serbia.

List of papal representatives to Yugoslavia 
Apostolic Nuncios to Yugoslavia 
Francesco Cherubini (2 March 1920 – 15 February 1921)
Ermenegildo Pellegrinetti (29 May 1922 – 13 December 1937) 
Ettore Felici (21 April 1938 – 15 January 1946)
Felici spent much of the Second World War working at the Secretariat of State in Rome; the establishment of the Socialist Federal Republic of Yugoslavia in 1945 ended the relationship between the Holy See and the Kingdom of Yugoslavia.
Apostolic Delegates to Yugoslavia 
Mario Cagna (3 September 1966 – 11 May 1976)
 His title changed to Pro-Nuncio to Yugoslavia on 22 August 1970.

Apostolic Pro-Nuncios to Yugoslavia 
Michele Cecchini (18 June 1976 – 4 December 1984)
Francesco Colasuonno (8 January 1985 – 19 April 1986)
Gabriel Montalvo Higuera (12 June 1986 – 17 April 1993)
Apostolic Nuncios to Yugoslavia 
Santos Abril y Castelló (24 February 1996 – 4 March 2000)
Eugenio Sbarbaro (26 April 2000 – 8 August 2009)
By 2007, the Nunciature to Yugoslavia in concert with the restructuring of that nation became the Apostolic Nunciature to Serbia.

Notes

References

Yugoslavia